Dinosaur Bar-B-Que is a restaurant, blues venue, and biker bar chain located mostly in upstate New York with branches in New York City, and formerly in New Jersey, Illinois, Connecticut and Maryland.

History
First opened in 1988 on Willow Street in downtown Syracuse, the restaurant subsequently opened locations in older buildings of historical significance in several cities.  The Syracuse location used to be N&H tavern, and once housed a Cadillac dealership. The Rochester restaurant is a former Lehigh Valley Railroad station overlooking the Genesee River. The Buffalo restaurant is a former Universal Pictures film storage vault. The Brooklyn restaurant had been a tool & die shop and the Newark location was once a boxing club where Rubin Carter trained, Stamford was a Yale Lock Co. factory.

A cookbook with many of the restaurant's recipes was published titled Dinosaur Bar-B-Que: An American Roadhouse in 2001.

In late November 2006, the Syracuse location was affected by the Norovirus and was closed for about a week until cleared to reopen by county health inspectors. Hundreds of customers and employees were affected. It is unclear how the virus materialized. Onondaga County health inspectors did not find any fault on the part of the restaurant.

In May 2009, Dinosaur Bar-B-Que was voted America's best barbecue in ABC's Good Morning America poll.  Approximately 4000 out of the 7500 participants in the poll chose Dinosaur Bar-B-Que.

Adam Richman, host of the Travel Channel's Man v. Food, took the show to Syracuse (season 3, episode 13) on June 8, 2010. Dinosaur Bar-B-Que was the first stop for Richman, who tried the restaurant's "Pork-Sket" sandwich (which features 1/2 pound each of brisket and pulled pork). It was first broadcast on the Travel Channel on September 1, 2010.

In March 2015, a New York City law firm filed a class action lawsuit against Dinosaur Bar-B-Que, claiming the chain systematically underpaid its tipped workers. The firm, Fitapelli & Schaffer, has filed similar lawsuits on behalf of workers at T.G.I. Friday's and Chipotle.

Gallery

See also
 List of barbecue restaurants

References

External links

1988 establishments in New York (state)
Barbecue restaurants in the United States
Culture of Syracuse, New York
Restaurants established in 1988
Restaurants in New York (state)
Tourist attractions in Syracuse, New York